Patrick Power (March 17, 1815 – February 23, 1881) was a Canadian politician and a Member of Parliament for the riding of Halifax in Nova Scotia. He was born on March 17, 1815, at Kilmacthomas in County Waterford, Ireland. He immigrated to Nova Scotia in 1823 with his parents and later worked as a merchant in Canada.

He was first elected as a member of the Anti-Confederation Party on September 20, 1867. On January 30, 1869, he became a member of the Liberal Party, but in 1870 he became an Independent Liberal. He ran for re-election and lost on October 12, 1872. He was re-elected to the 3rd Canadian Parliament on January 22, 1874, but he was defeated in the next election on September 17, 1878.

In 1876, he was offered a position in Alexander Mackenzie's Cabinet to replace Thomas Coffin, but he declined. Ill since 1877, he retired from politics following his electoral defeat in 1878 and died on February 23, 1881. During life, he worked on various boards and commissions themed with the education and welfare of the poor. For his charity work, he was awarded the Order of St. Gregory the Great by Pope Pius IX in 1870. His son, Lawrence Geoffrey Power, was a member of the Senate. The Patrick Power Library at St. Mary's University in Halifax bears his namesake.

Electoral history

External links
 
 

Anti-Confederation Party MPs
Irish emigrants to pre-Confederation Nova Scotia
Members of the House of Commons of Canada from Nova Scotia
1815 births
1881 deaths
Liberal Party of Canada MPs
Independent Liberal MPs in Canada
Politicians from County Waterford